The 2016 United States Senate election in Illinois was held on November 8, 2016, to elect a member of the United States Senate to represent the State of Illinois, concurrently with the 2016 U.S. presidential election, as well as other elections to the United States Senate in other states and elections to the United States House of Representatives and various state and local elections.

Prior to the election, Mark Kirk was considered to be the most vulnerable senator from either party seeking re-election in 2016 due to Illinois's heavy Democratic partisan balance with news networks and analysts expecting a Democratic pick-up.

Party primary elections in Illinois were held March 15, 2016. Incumbent Republican U.S. Senator Mark Kirk ran for re-election to a second full term, but was easily defeated by Democratic nominee Tammy Duckworth, the U.S. representative from Illinois's 8th congressional district and a decorated combat veteran of the Iraq War. Duckworth became the first woman elected to the U.S. Senate from Illinois since Carol Moseley Braun in 1992. Despite his loss, Kirk did manage to outperform Trump in the concurrent election by around 1 percent.

Election information
The primaries and general elections coincided with those for United States President and House, as well as those for state offices.

Background
In 2010, Republican Mark Kirk was elected to the Senate  for Illinois, defeating Democratic nominee Alexi Giannoulias by 59,220 votes out of more than 3.7 million votes cast.

Kirk suffered a severe stroke in January 2012 that kept him away from the Senate until January 2013. In June 2013 he confirmed that he was "planning" to run for re-election, but there was speculation that he might retire, particularly in the wake of the departure of several of his senior staff. Republican Bruce Rauner was elected Governor in 2014, and a possible scenario was that Kirk would resign early, allowing Rauner to appoint another Republican as the replacement.  Potential replacements  included U.S. Representatives Bob Dold, Adam Kinzinger, Aaron Schock, and Peter Roskam, State Senators Jason Barickman and Christine Radogno, hedge fund manager and founder and CEO of Citadel LLC Kenneth C. Griffin, and businesswoman Beth Christie. In November 2014, Kirk reiterated that he was going to run for re-election.

Kirk was identified by The Washington Post, The New York Times, Politico, The Huffington Post, Slate and Roll Call as one of the most vulnerable Republican senators up for re-election in 2016.

Turnout

For the primary election, turnout was 41.94%, with 3,215,334 votes cast. For the general election, turnout was 68.39%, with 5,491,878 votes cast.

Republican primary

Candidates

Declared 
 Mark Kirk, incumbent U.S. Senator
 James Marter, businessman

Removed from ballot 
 Elizabeth Pahlke, independent candidate for IL-02 in 2013

Withdrawn 
 Ron Wallace, investment advisor, conservative activist and economics professor

Declined 
 William J. Kelly, television producer, nominee for IL-01 in 1994, candidate for Illinois Comptroller in 2010 and candidate for Mayor of Chicago in 2015
 Bobby Schilling, former U.S. Representative
 Joe Walsh, conservative radio talk show host and former U.S. Representative

Endorsements

Polling

Results

Democratic primary

Candidates

Declared 
 Tammy Duckworth, U.S. Representative
 Napoleon Harris, state senator and candidate for Illinois's 2nd congressional district in 2013
 Andrea Zopp, former president and CEO of the Chicago Urban League and former Chicago Board of Education member

Withdrawn 
 Tio Hardiman, former director of CeaseFire and candidate for governor in 2014 (ran for IL-01, then withdrew to run for Cook County Clerk of Court)
 Robert Marshall, radiologist and perennial candidate (running for IL-06)

Declined 
 Daniel Biss, state senator (running for state comptroller)
 Richard Boykin, Cook County Commissioner
 Cheri Bustos, U.S. Representative
 Jacqueline Y. Collins, state senator
 Tom Dart, Sheriff of Cook County
 Bill Foster, U.S. Representative
 Mike Frerichs, Illinois Treasurer
 Daniel Hynes, former Illinois Comptroller, candidate for U.S. Senate in 2004 and candidate for governor of Illinois in 2010
 Robin Kelly, U.S. Representative
 Lisa Madigan, Illinois Attorney General
 Michelle Obama, First Lady of the United States
 Mike Quigley, U.S. Representative
 Pat Quinn, former governor of Illinois
 Kwame Raoul, state senator
 Jan Schakowsky, U.S. Representative
 Sheila Simon, former lieutenant governor of Illinois and nominee for Illinois Comptroller in 2014

Endorsements

Polling

Results

Third party candidates 
On July 6, the Green Party candidate and the Libertarian Party candidate were announced as having made the ballot for November after no objections were filed against their petitions. However, objections against two others were filed, namely: the Constitution Party candidate Chad Koppie, due to his name being on a petition slate with Constitution Party presidential candidate Darrell Castle who turned in fewer than the required petitions needed, and against Independent candidate Eric Conklin. Neither Koppie nor Conklin are likely to receive ballot access after a review of their petitions.

Constitution Party (C) (Write in) 
 Chad Koppie, farmer and vice president of Kane County Regional Board of School Trustees

Libertarian Party (L) 
 Kent McMillen

Green Party (G) 
 Scott Summers, attorney and former member of the McHenry County College Board of Trustees

Independent (I) 
 Eric M. Conklin, law enforcement officer

General election 
 Mark Kirk (R), incumbent U.S. Senator
 Tammy Duckworth (D), U.S. Representative
 Chad Koppie (C) (Write-in)
 Kenton McMillen (L)
 Scott Summers (G)

Debates

Campaign 
Kirk had multiple factors working against him, as no Republican had won an Illinois US Senate race during a presidential election year since 1972, and he had made a number of gaffes during the campaign. He had exaggerated his Iraq War record on his campaign website, and during a debate, Kirk made a racially charged remark about Duckworth's familial military background. Additionally, Republican presidential nominee Donald Trump was unpopular in Chicago and its suburbs, and Kirk refused to endorse or vote for him, instead writing in former United States Secretary of State Colin Powell. Kirk also had a mostly liberal voting record in the Senate, favoring gay marriage, an assault weapons ban, and he had voted against defunding and repealing portions of Obamacare in 2015. Due to these factors, Kirk alienated the Democratic, Independent, and Republican voters whom he had previously won over in his 2010 campaign. Unusually, the normally Republican-leaning editorial board of the Chicago Tribune endorsed Duckworth, as they believed that the health problems that Kirk had suffered as a result of his stroke made him a less effective Senator. This election had been cited as historic as both major party nominees had physical disabilities.

Endorsements

Predictions

Polling

with Andrea Zopp

with Lisa Madigan

with Michelle Obama

with Pat Quinn

Results 
Democratic U.S. Representative Tammy Duckworth easily defeated the Republican incumbent senator Mark Kirk. Polls showed Kirk would be easily defeated by Duckworth, and the polls were proven right when Duckworth was declared the winner quickly after polls closed in Illinois. Duckworth performed extremely well in the heavily populated and strongly Democratic Cook County, home of Chicago. Duckworth also did well in Champaign, East St. Louis and Carbondale. Kirk did do well in rural parts of the state. The Chicago 'collar counties' — among them Kirk's home county of Lake County — failed to deliver for the incumbent, and they easily went for Duckworth. Duckworth was sworn in at 12:00 P.M. EST on January 3, 2017.

The Libertarian and Green candidates polled well, winning three and two percent of the vote respectively.

References

External links 
Official campaign websites
 Mark Kirk (R) for Senate 
 Tammy Duckworth (D) for Senate 
 Eric M. Conklin (I) for Senate 
 Chad Koppie (C) for Senate 
 Kent McMillen (L) for Senate 
 Scott Summers (G) for Senate 

Senate
Illinois
2016